is a railway station in the city of Gamagōri, Aichi Prefecture, Japan, jointly operated by the  Central Japan Railway Company (JR Tōkai) and Meitetsu.

Lines
Gamagōri Station is 310.6 kilometers from Tokyo Station on the Tōkaidō Main Line and serves as a terminal station for the 17.6 kilometer Meitetsu Gamagōri Line.

Station layout

JR Central
The JR Central station has two elevated island platforms serving four tracks, of which only the inner tracks (tracks 2 and 3) are normally used. The station building is underneath the platforms and has automated ticket machines, TOICA automated turnstiles and is staffed.

Meitetsu
Meitetsu Gamagōri Station has a single elevated island platform serving two tracks. Both tracks terminate at this station.

Adjacent stations

Station history
Gamagōri Station opened on September 1, 1888 when the section of the Japanese Government Railway (JGR) connecting Hamamatsu Station with Ōbu Station was completed. This line was named the Tōkaidō Line in 1895. On July 24, 1936, the Mikawa Railway (now part of Meitetsu) connected to Gamagōri Station. The JGR became the JNR after World War II. The JNR portion of the station was extensively remodeled in the mid-1960s, with a new station building completed from 1968-1969. The Meitesu portion was likewise remodeled in the early 1970s, with a new station building and bus terminal completed in 1972. With the dissolution and privatization of the JNR on April 1, 1987, the JNR station came under the control of the Central Japan Railway Company. The Tōkaidō Line tracks were elevated in 2003-2005, and a JR station building was completed in 2006. Automated turnstiles using the TOICA IC Card system came into operation from November 25, 2006.

Station numbering was introduced to the section of the Tōkaidō Line operated JR Central in March 2018; Gamagōri Station was assigned station number CA47.

Passenger statistics
In fiscal 2017, the JR  portion of the station was used by an average of 7,838 passengers daily (boarding passengers only) and the Meitetsu portion of the station by 1407 passengers daily.

Surrounding area
 Gamagōri City Hall
 Gamagōri High School

See also
 List of Railway Stations in Japan

References

Yoshikawa, Fumio. Tokaido-sen 130-nen no ayumi. Grand-Prix Publishing (2002) .

External links

Meitetsu Gamagori Station  
JR Gamagori Station (in Japanese)

Railway stations in Japan opened in 1888
Railway stations in Aichi Prefecture
Tōkaidō Main Line
Stations of Central Japan Railway Company
Stations of Nagoya Railroad
Gamagōri, Aichi